Christine Peterson is an American forecaster, and the co-founder of Foresight Institute.  She is credited with suggesting the term "open source" when used in connection with software.

Peterson holds a bachelor's degree in chemistry from MIT.

Works

Open Source Software

As reported on Slashdot, she coined the term on February 3, 1998:

Books
In 1991 she coauthored Unbounding the Future: the Nanotechnology Revolution with Gayle Pergamit and Eric Drexler, which sketches nanotechnology's potential environmental and medical benefits as well as possible abuses. In 1997 she coauthored Leaping the Abyss: Putting Group Genius to Work with Gayle Pergamit.

Articles
"Thinking Longer Term about Technology", 2009.

References

External links
 Foresight Institute web page

American nanotechnologists
American women scientists
Year of birth missing (living people)
Living people
21st-century American women